Elijah Isa Mitrou-Long (born December 15, 1996) is a Greek-Canadian professional basketball player for Aris Thessaloniki of the Greek Basket League. He played college basketball for Mount St. Mary's, Texas, and UNLV.

Early life and high school career
Mitrou-Long grew up in Mississauga, Ontario. He played football and hockey but focused his attention on basketball. At the age of 15, he enrolled at The John Carroll School in Bel Air, Maryland, and lived with a host family. As a junior, he averaged 10 points, four rebounds and four assists per game. Mitrou-Long averaged 10.2 points, 4.2 rebounds, 3.3 assists and 1.5 steals per game as a senior. He competed for CIA Bounce in AAU play.

College career
Mitrou-Long began his college career at Mount St. Mary's. He averaged 5.6 points, 2.5 rebounds and 2.2 assists per game as a freshman. Mitrou-Long scored a career-high 29 points including a late go-ahead layup on February 18, 2017, in a 79–74 win against Fairleigh Dickinson. As a sophomore, he averaged 15.0 points, 5.2 rebounds, 4.4 assists and 1.6 steals per game, earning First Team All-NEC honors. Mitrou-Long helped lead the team to a NEC regular-season and tournament championships, scoring 22 points in the tournament title game against St. Francis (PA) and earned NEC Tournament MVP honors. He transferred to Texas after the season, the only school he visited, and redshirted the 2017–18 season per NCAA regulations.

As a redshirt junior, Mitrou-Long started nine games averaging 5.6 points, 2.2 rebounds and 1.6 assists per game for a team that finished 21-16 and won the NIT. Following the season, he transferred to UNLV where he was eligible immediately as a graduate transfer. Mitrou-Long joined former Mount St. Mary's teammate Jonah Antonio at UNLV, who told him that coach T. J. Otzelberger was very honest and straightforward. On November 30, 2019, Mitrou-Long tied his career-high with 29 points in a 72–65 overtime loss to Cincinnati. Mitrou-Long missed 12 games in December 2019 and January 2020 with a broken thumb, and his season ended after sustaining a knee injury during a February 29 win against San Jose State. As a senior, Mitrou-Long averaged 12.6 points, 3.3 rebounds, 3.4 assists, and 1.7 steals per game.

Professional career
On July 29, 2020, Mitrou-Long signed his first professional contract with PAOK of the Greek Basket League. In 13 games, he averaged 4.2 points, 1.5 rebounds and 1.2 assists, playing 14.4 minutes per contest. Subsequently he suffered a season-ending right knee injury. On August 18, 2021, he officially parted ways with the Greek club.

On October 25, 2021, Mitrou-Long signed a one-year deal with Levski Sofia of the National Basketball League. Playing for the Bulgarian club, he averaged 14 points, 3.5 rebounds and 5.6 assists per game. 

On January 9, 2022, Mitrou-Long agreed to terms with Apollon Patras, returning to the Greek Basket League. In 13 games, he averaged 10.8 points, 3.4 rebounds, 3 assists and 1 steal, playing around 25 minutes per contest.

On August 8, 2022, Mitrou-Long signed with Semt77 Yalovaspor of the Turkish Basketball First League (TBL), but he never appeared in a single game for them. On November 5, 2022, he returned to Greece for Aris Thessaloniki, replacing the injured Josh Hagins.

Personal life
Mitrou-Long is the son of Jersey Long and Georgia Mitrou. His father is of Trinidadian descent while his mother is a Greek Canadian. Mitrou-Long has three siblings and six half-siblings. His brother, Naz Mitrou-Long, played college basketball for Iowa State and later in the NBA for the Indiana Pacers. One of his favorite players is former UNLV forward Anthony Bennett, who mentored Mitrou-Long growing up.

References

External links
UNLV Runnin' Rebels bio
Texas Longhorns bio
Mount St. Mary's Mountaineers bio

1996 births
Living people
Apollon Patras B.C. players
Aris B.C. players
Basketball people from Ontario
BC Levski Sofia players
Canadian men's basketball players
Amateur Athletic Union men's basketball players
Canadian expatriate basketball people in Bulgaria
Canadian expatriate basketball people in Greece
Canadian expatriate basketball people in Turkey
Canadian expatriate basketball people in the United States
Greek expatriate basketball people in the United States
Point guards
P.A.O.K. BC players
Mount St. Mary's Mountaineers men's basketball players
Texas Longhorns men's basketball players
UNLV Runnin' Rebels basketball players
Shooting guards
Sportspeople from Mississauga